5,6-Dimethylbenzimidazole is a natural benzimidazole derivative.  It is a component of vitamin B12 where is serves as a ligand for the cobalt atom.

5,6-Dimethylbenzimidazole is biosynthesized from flavin mononucleotide by the enzyme 5,6-dimethylbenzimidazole synthase.

References

Benzimidazoles